The 2011–12 Utah Valley Wolverines men's basketball team represented Utah Valley University in the 2011–12 college basketball season. This was head coach Dick Hunsaker's tenth season at UVU. The Wolverines played their home games at the UCCU Center and are members of the Great West Conference. They finished the season 20–13, 9–1 in Great West play to be crowned regular season champions. They lost in the semifinals of the Great West Basketball tournament in overtime to NJIT. They were invited to the 2012 CollegeInsider.com Tournament where they lost in the first round to Weber State.

Roster

Schedule and results
Source

|-
!colspan=12 style="background:#006633; color:#CFB53B;"| Regular season

|-
!colspan=9 style="background:#006633; color:#CFB53B;" | 2012 Great West Conference Tournament

|-
!colspan=12 style="background:#006633; color:#CFB53B;" | 2012 CollegeInsider.com Postseason Tournament

References

Utah Valley Wolverines men's basketball seasons
Utah Valley
Utah Valley